Wang Guangmei (26 September 1921 – 13 October 2006) was a Chinese politician, philanthropist and the wife of Liu Shaoqi, who served as the President of the People's Republic of China from 1959 to 1968.

Life

Early years

Wang Guangmei was born in 1921, and grew up in a distinguished and prominent Chinese family. Her father was a government minister and a diplomat; her mother was an educator. She studied French, Russian and English, learning to speak all three, and earned a degree in physics from the Catholic University of Peking in Beijing. She also studied at an American missionary university, and was described as a sophisticated woman. She intended to go to the United States to continue her Ph.D. degree and obtain a full scholarship from the Department of Atomic Physics at Stanford University and the University of Chicago. In the Spring Festival of 1946, the Peking Underground Party of the Chinese Communist Party invited her to serve as an English translator for the CCP delegation of the Peking Military Mediation Office. Since she was in contact with the Peking Underground Party of the Chinese Communist Party on the eve of victory in the Second Sino-Japanese War, she became acquainted with the leaders of the Working Committee of Fu Jen Catholic University of the Chinese Communist Party. In the mid-1940s, Wang Guangmei traveled to the Communist Party headquarters in Yan'an and served as an interpreter during efforts by the American statesman George Marshall to negotiate a truce between the Nationalist government and the Communist rebels. During this time she gained the admiration of many Americans, which would later play a role in charges that she was an American spy.

There, at the age of 24, she met Liu Shaoqi, who was nearly twice her age and had previously been married on five occasions. For years she served as his secretary, and he was named a key deputy to Chairman Mao Zedong after the Communists took power in 1949. In 1959, Liu was named Chinese President, making him the second-most powerful man in the country.

First lady

After Liu became president in 1959, Wang became a very visible diplomatic companion to him. Wang Guangmei became once widely known in China as its beautiful, articulate, sophisticated first lady. In the early 1960s, the couple traveled abroad on state visits to Afghanistan, Burma, Pakistan and Indonesia. In 1963, she joined a work team investigating corruption in the countryside, a mounting problem after the Great Leap Forward, Mao's catastrophic development programme of 1958–61, which led to widespread famine. In 1963, she secretly visited Funing County and summarized the Taoyuan Experience.

Cultural Revolution
Liu and his wife became targets of the Cultural Revolution, instigated by Chairman Mao. In mid-1966, when  Red Guards erupted into prominence — and Liu and other leaders tried to fathom what Mao had in mind — Wang headed a work team to restore order among the students at Tsinghua University. The effort backfired when she came under attack by a militant opponent who accused her of being a counterrevolutionary. Her husband was also under fire by Mao and his deputies for being the leading "capitalist roader". Wang was accused of being a "spy for the imperialist services" (a reference to American intelligence) and, according to Madame Mao, "Sukarno's whore" for wearing a pearl necklace and evening gown to meet the Indonesian president.

Wang Guangmei's public role had antagonized Mao's wife Jiang Qing, who was growing politically ambitious. In April 1967, at Jiang's instigation, the Red Guards forced Wang to put on a tight-fitting qipao dress she had worn at a banquet in Indonesia, with silk stockings, high heels and a mocking necklace made out of ping-pong balls, as proof of her bourgeoise, counterrevolutionary attitude.

Wang was put under house arrest, then imprisoned. Her four children were also punished. Imprisoned in Qincheng Prison during the cultural revolution, Wang was kept in ignorance of her family's fate. After four years, her children plucked up the courage to ask Mao for permission to see their parents. It was through Mao's terse consent, "their father is dead but they may see the mother", that Wang learned of her husband's death. Wang spent about 12 years in prison, and was released in 1979 — just before Mao's widow Jiang Qing and her Gang of Four, who were blamed for the excesses of the Cultural Revolution, were put on trial.

Later years
Soon, Liu's reputation was rehabilitated, and Wang received compensation for her suffering during the Cultural Revolution  In March 1978, Wang was elected as a member of the Fifth National Committee of the Chinese People's Political Consultative Conference. In December of the same year, she was restored of her personal freedom and status. In 1979, she served as Director of the Foreign Affairs Bureau of the Chinese Academy of Social Sciences. In 1980, she appeared in court during the trial of the Gang of Four as a victim of Jiang Qing's persecution. Later, Wang was elected a permanent member of the National People's Political Consultative Conference.

From 1984, she served as the chairwoman of the Beijing Alumni Association of Fu Jen Catholic University. In 1989, Wang Guangmei suffered from breast cancer  and went through two major operations before and after. Later, due to tumor metastasis, she underwent major surgery again. In 1995, she founded the "Hope Project", a program aimed at aiding the poor throughout China. She even donated her family's valuable antiques, a few dating back to the Qing and Song dynasties, to charity and donated the proceeds of 566,000 yuan to the "Hope Project". In October 1998, she won the honorary award of the third "China Population Award".

Around 2000, she underwent another operation, and her health gradually deteriorated. In 2005, she resigned from the post of planning director. 
Wang died on October 13, 2006, at the No. 305 Military Hospital in Beijing due to lung infection caused by heart failure. Her funeral was held at the Babaoshan Revolutionary Martyrs' Cemetery in Beijing on October 21, 2006.

Four days after her death, she was selected by the China Foundation for Poverty Alleviation as the winner of the 2nd China "Poverty Elimination Award" Achievement Award. On October 24, Fu Jen Catholic University in Taipei held a memorial service for her at the Yesheng Building on campus.

Family

Wang is survived by four children.

Her eldest son, retired Gen. Liu Yuan, was a prominent officer in the People's Liberation Army.

Her daughter Liu Ting graduated from Boston University and Harvard Business School, and is chairman and president of the Asia Link Group, consultants in corporate finance.

References

Notes

Bibliography
 "  Wang Guangmei and Peach Garden Experience," in Timothy Cheek, Klaus Mühlhahn, and Hans J. Van de Ven, ed., Chinese Communist Party : A Century in Ten Lives  (Cambridge University Press, 2021).

External links
Short Biography on chinavitae.com
"Wang Guangmei, 85, Dies; Former First Lady of China", The New York Times, October 17, 2006
Wang Guangmei on China Digital Times
Wang Guangmei on Guardian Unlimited

1921 births
2006 deaths
Liu Shaoqi family
Chinese Communist Party politicians from Tianjin
People of the Cultural Revolution
Spouses of national leaders
Catholic University of Peking alumni
Victims of the Cultural Revolution
Republic of China politicians from Tianjin
People's Republic of China politicians from Tianjin
Burials at Babaoshan Revolutionary Cemetery
Spouses of Chinese politicians
20th-century women philanthropists
Chinese women philanthropists